The A236 highway is a highway in Nigeria. It is one of the east-west roads linking the main south-north roads. (It is named from the two highways it links).

It runs from the A2 highway at Zaria, Kaduna State to the A3 highway at Jos, the capital of Plateau State.

References

Highways in Nigeria